Li Yan is an oil painting artist, born in Jilin, China in 1977, who lives and works in Beijing, China.

Solo exhibitions
 2014  Limitless, Galerie Klaus Gerrit Friese, Stuttgart
 2011  The Catastrophic World-A Chinese paints our age, Ling Galerie, Berlin
 2010  Accidents, Ling Galerie, Berlin
 2009  Snippet, Yamamoto Gendai Gallery, Tokyo
 2008  Quotidian Truths - Paintings by LiYan, Moronokiang Gallery, Los Angeles
 2007  Accident, Platform China, Beijing

Selected exhibitions
 2017  China meets Europe, Museum Villa Haiss, Zell am Harmersbach, Germany
 2016  17th Asian Art Biennale Bangladesh 2016, National Art Gallery, Dhaka, Bangladesh
 2016  Root Scene – Chinese Contemporary Art Group Show, China Exchange UK, London
 2016  Benjamin Sigg Collection "Art of Collecting", Poly Gallery Hong Kong, Cobo House, Hong Kong
 2015  All Living Creatures Scene, Taiwan Chia Nan Museum, Tainan
 2015  Individual Scene, The Art Gallery of Sichuan University
 2015  Exhibition on Summer’s Threshold, Embassy of The Czech Republic in China, Beijing
 2015  Reflections of Spring, Art Seasons Gallery, Beijing
 2013  Dreams of China, Python Gallery, Zurich
 2013  The Sixth Chengdu Biennale, Chengdu Contemporary Art Museum, Chengdu
 2012  Yan Li - Li Yan: Two Sides of A Mirror, Embassy of the Czech Republic in China, Beijing
 2011  Prague Action, China Czech Contemporary Museum, Beijing
 2010  Emerging Artists from North, Mountain Art Beijing & Frank Lin Art Center, Beijing
 2009  China Urban, Douglas F. Cooley Memorial Art Gallery, Reed College, Portland
 2008  The Revolution Continues: New Art From China, Saatchi Gallery, London
 2008  Fear, Wedel Fine Art, London
 2008  China trifft Berlin, Emerson Gallery, Berlin
 2008  <Self-experience> - Young Artists Group Show, Platform China, Beijing
 2007  Beijing Lightning Factory First Exhibition, Beijing lightning factory
 2005  The Second Chengdu Biennale, Chengdu Contemporary Art Museum, Chengdu
 2004  The 10th National Fine Arts Exhibition—Oil Painting Exhibition, Guangdong Art Museum, Guangzhou
 2004  Zhenxing Northeast Industry District Fine Arts Exhibition, Liaoning Art Museum, Shenyang 
 2002  Graduation Exhibition of Eight Fine Arts Academies, Hexiangning Art Museum, Shenzhen

References

External links

Living people
1977 births
Painters from Jilin